Morgan Williams may refer to:
Morgan B. Williams (1831–1903), member of the U.S. House of Representatives from Pennsylvania
Morgan Williams (ecologist) (born 1943), former Parliamentary Commissioner for the Environment in New Zealand
Morgan Williams (politician) (1878–1970), New Zealand Member of Parliament
Morgan Williams (rugby union, born 1976), Canadian rugby union player
Morgan Williams (rugby union, born 1995), Welsh rugby union player
Morgan Williams (footballer) (born 1999), English footballer

See also
 Morgan William (born 1996), American women's basketball player